The 1979 Southwestern Louisiana Ragin' Cajuns football team was an American football team that represented the University of Southwestern Louisiana (now known as the University of Louisiana at Lafayette) in the Southland Conference during the 1979 NCAA Division I-A football season. In their sixth year under head coach Augie Tammariello, the team compiled a 4–7 record.

Schedule

References

Southwestern Louisiana
Louisiana Ragin' Cajuns football seasons
Southwestern Louisiana Ragin' Cajuns football